Erik Willem Heijblok (born 29 May 1977) is a Dutch former professional footballer who played as a goalkeeper.

Career
Heijblok started his career at amateur side Hollandia before signing his first professional contract at HFC Haarlem in 2003 where he became their first goalkeeper straight away. In four seasons he had 126 appearances for the club, all at Eerste Divisie level. He then signed for Eredivisie side Ajax where he became their third goalkeeper behind Maarten Stekelenburg and Dennis Gentenaar for the 2007–08 season. 

After Ajax, Heijblok signed for Eredivisievside De Graafschap on 30 June 2008. After one season he then transferred to 2008–09 Eredivisie champions AZ Alkmaar on 24 June 2009 for two seasons. He eventually stayed until the summer of 2014, having served the team as a third goalkeeper for five years. He signed a one-year deal with Eerste Divisie side FC Volendam on 30 June 2014. Shortly after, in September 2014, he announced his retirement from football, citing health-related issues linked to playing on artificial turf.

Honours
AZ
 KNVB Cup: 2012–13

References

External links
 Voetbal International profile 

1977 births
Living people
People from Wieringen
Dutch footballers
Association football goalkeepers
Eredivisie players
Eerste Divisie players
HVV Hollandia players
HFC Haarlem players
AFC Ajax players
De Graafschap players
AZ Alkmaar players
FC Volendam players
Footballers from North Holland